Melichrus is a genus of flowering plants in the family Ericaceae. The genus is endemic to Australia.

Species include:

Melichrus adpressus A.Cunn. ex DC. - large nectar-heath 
Melichrus erubescens A.Cunn. ex DC. - ruby urn-heath
Melichrus hirsutus J.B.Williams
Melichrus procumbens (Cav.) Druce - jam tarts
Melichrus urceolatus R.Br. - urn heath
Melichrus sp. Bruce Rock
Melichrus sp. Bungalbin Hill
Melichrus sp. Coolgardie
Melichrus sp. Gibberagee   
Melichrus sp. Inglewood
Melichrus sp. Isla Gorge  
Melichrus sp. Newfoundland State Forest
Melichrus sp. Tara

References

Epacridoideae
Ericaceae genera
Ericales of Australia